The Ambassador Extraordinary and Plenipotentiary of the Russian Federation to the Republic of Ireland is the official representative of the President and the Government of the Russian Federation to the President and the Government of Ireland.

The ambassador and his staff work at large in the Embassy of Russia in Dublin.

History of diplomatic relations

Diplomatic relations between Ireland and the Soviet Union were established on 29 September 1973, with the publishing of a joint communiqué on the exchange of diplomatic missions. Both countries began to exchange ambassadors from 1973 onwards. With the dissolution of the Soviet Union in 1991, Ireland recognised the Russian Federation as its successor state. The incumbent Soviet ambassador, Nikolai Kozyrev, continued to serve as representative of Russia until 1998.

List of representatives (1973 – present)

Representatives of the Soviet Union to Ireland (1973 – 1991)

Representatives of the Russian Federation to Ireland (1991 – present)

References

 
Ireland
Russia